Issouf Ouattara (born 7 October 1988) is a Burkinabé professional footballer who plays as a forward.

Club career
Born in Ouagadougou, Ouattara began his career in Etoile Filante Ouagadougou. In July 2008 he signed with Portugal's U.D. Leiria in the second division, and played his first game on 30 August in a 1–0 home loss against Portimonense where he came on as a second-half substitute. He contributed with 26 matches (one goal) as the club promoted back to the Primeira Liga, but appeared significantly less in the following year.

In September 2011, after spending the 2010–11 season on loan to C.D. Trofense– second level, less than one third of the matches played – Ouattara left Leiria and signed for Nîmes Olympique in the French division three. In the following campaign he moved teams and countries again, joining Bulgaria's PSFC Chernomorets Burgas after a period of trial.

In his only full season in the country, Ouattara was voted his club's Best Foreign Player in a poll conducted in its official website, earning over 1,000 votes. He was released in late 2013.

International career
Ouattara made his debut for Burkina Faso not yet aged 19, helping to a 1–1 home draw against Mozambique on 24 March 2007 for the 2008 Africa Cup of Nations qualifiers. He was selected for the 2013 edition of the tournament on 8 January, playing against Togo in the quarter-finals in an eventual runner-up finish for the nation.

Scores and results list Burkina Faso's goal tally first, score column indicates score after each Ouattara goal.

References

External links

1988 births
Living people
Sportspeople from Ouagadougou
Burkinabé footballers
Association football forwards
Burkina Faso international footballers
2010 Africa Cup of Nations players
2013 Africa Cup of Nations players
Étoile Filante de Ouagadougou players
Burkinabé expatriate footballers
Expatriate footballers in Portugal
Burkinabé expatriate sportspeople in Portugal
Primeira Liga players
Liga Portugal 2 players
U.D. Leiria players
C.D. Trofense players
Expatriate footballers in France
Burkinabé expatriate sportspeople in France
Championnat National players
Nîmes Olympique players
Expatriate footballers in Bulgaria
Burkinabé expatriate sportspeople in Bulgaria
First Professional Football League (Bulgaria) players
PFC Chernomorets Burgas players
Expatriate footballers in Libya
Burkinabé expatriate sportspeople in Libya
Al-Nasr SC (Benghazi) players
Expatriate footballers in Cyprus
Burkinabé expatriate sportspeople in Cyprus
Cypriot First Division players
Ermis Aradippou FC players
Expatriate footballers in Egypt
Burkinabé expatriate sportspeople in Egypt
Egyptian Premier League players
Wadi Degla SC players
Al Masry SC players
Expatriate footballers in Iraq
Burkinabé expatriate sportspeople in Iraq
Al-Talaba SC players
Expatriate footballers in Saudi Arabia
Burkinabé expatriate sportspeople in Saudi Arabia
Saudi Second Division players
Wej SC players
Al-Sharq Club players
Libyan Premier League players
21st-century Burkinabé people